B&H Photo Video (also known as B&H Photo and B&H and B&H Foto & Electronics Corporation) is an American photo and video equipment retailer founded in 1973, based in Manhattan, New York City. B&H conducts business primarily through online e-commerce consumer sales and business to business sales, as they only have one retail location.

Ownership and clientele 

B&H Photo Video targets professional photographers and videographers. It operates a warehouse located in Florence, New Jersey.

The owner of the company, Herman Schreiber, and many of the store's employees are observant Satmar Hasidic Jews. The company’s brick-and-mortar store in Manhattan is closed on Shabbat, most Jewish holidays, and Christmas. Although the B&H Web site is accessible on Shabbat, checkout and processing of online orders are unavailable during Shabbat (from sundown Friday evening till Saturday evening) and Jewish holidays according to local (New York) time.

History
B&H opened in 1973 as a storefront film shop at 17 Warren Street in Tribeca, and took its name from the initials of owners Blimie Schreiber and her husband, Herman. Later in the 1970s, B&H moved to 119 West 17th Street between Sixth and Seventh Avenues in the Photo District and began to expand its stock to a wider range of film and photography products. In 1997, the store moved to its present location.

B&H is located just south of Hell's Kitchen, Manhattan, at 420 Ninth Avenue at the intersection with West 34th Street.

Also in 2007, B&H moved its offices to 440 9th Avenue in Manhattan.  As the company has grown, it expanded its office presence to accommodate sales, customer service, buying, marketing, and various back office functions; these functions are housed in 150,000 square feet of office space.

The store has an extensive conveyor belt system that runs along the ceiling.

In 2015, B&H added an Apple authorized shop to the computer department with an assortment of Apple products. There is an Apple employee in shop to assist and consult. In 2016, Vaio announced that they signed a contract with B&H photo video to offer their products.

Philanthropy
B&H and its employees have been active supporters of organizations dedicated to bringing photography and videography to broader audiences.  In 2018, B&H sponsored Bushwick Stories, a documentary workshop for young storytellers created by the Bushwick Film Festival. For many years, B&H has sponsored NYC Salt, a program that offers intensive photography training to NYC high school students. B&H also sponsors programs and fellowships at BRIC, the largest presenter of free cultural programming in Brooklyn. B&H has worked with partners including Intel to donate tech equipment to NYC public school classrooms.

During the COVID-19 pandemic, B&H organized "Days of Appreciation" for health care workers at Lenox Hill Hospital and other NYC hospitals.

Controversies
In October 2007, it was announced that B&H Photo agreed to pay US$4.3 million to settle allegations that it discriminated against Hispanic workers, while not admitting any wrongdoing.

In November 2009, a lawsuit against B&H Photo alleged that the store refused to hire women, in violation of New York City and New York State Human Rights Laws. The lawsuit, brought by four women, sought class action status on behalf of all women discriminated against by B&H over the course of many years. Given B&H's prior alleged discriminatory practices, the lawsuit sought US$19 million in compensatory and punitive damages to deter future discriminatory practices.

In 2011, a lawsuit alleged discrimination against Hispanic workers.

In February 2016, the United States Department of Labor Office of Contract Compliance filed a lawsuit against B&H alleging that the company had hired Hispanic men only into entry-level jobs in a Brooklyn warehouse, and then subjected them to harassment and unsanitary conditions. On August 16, 2017, the company announced that it had settled this matter for a reported $3.22 million, while not admitting any wrongdoing.

In November 2019, according to The Verge, the Attorney General of New York State filed a lawsuit alleging that B&H knowingly failed to pay millions of dollars in sales taxes due in New York. The company's spokesperson has said that "B&H has done nothing wrong and it is outrageous".  According to B&H, the Attorney General is alleging that customers should pay sales tax on pre-discounted prices, not on the actual selling price, which is the widespread industry practice. In September 2021, the NY Supreme Court ruled in B&H’s favor and dismissed the Attorney General’s suit agreeing with B&H’s position in the matter.

Recognition
In May 2007, Zagat wrote that B&H offers "more cameras than the paparazzi at the Oscars", with "cordial" staffers who "know their stuff".

In 2015, their Google Play app was named the "Best Mobile Shopping App" at the Mobile Shop Conference.

In 2016, Consumer Reports awarded B&H Photo its No. 1 Top Rating for Best Electronics Retailer. In 2018 it named it the leading online consumer electronics retailer.

In May 2018, B&H was named by Forbes Magazine as one of America's Best Midsize Employers for 2018.  The Forbes recognition was based on independent employee surveys conducted by Forbes.

Also in 2018, B&H's consumer website was recognized as the Best for User Experience of any e-commerce company by the Baymard Institute.

Newsweek named B&H as one of America's Top Companies for Customer Service in 2019, with top position in the consumer electronics category based on over 130,000 customer evaluations. Newsweek again recognized B&H for excellence in Customer Service for 2020.

See also

References

External links

 

34th Street (Manhattan)
Companies based in Manhattan
Consumer electronics retailers in the United States
Midtown Manhattan
Orthodox Judaism in New York City
Photographic retailers
Photography companies of the United States
Retail companies established in 1973
Shops in New York City